Founded in 1973 in the Los Angeles area, Ya Ho Wha 13, otherwise known as Ya Ho Wa 13 or Yahowha 13, is a psychedelic rock band fronted by Father Yod (pronounced Yōde), spiritual leader of a religious cult/commune called the Source Family. Ya Ho Wha without the vowels and spaces reduces to YHWH, the tetragrammaton. The band recorded nine LPs full of their extreme psychedelic sound with tribal drums and distorted guitars, some of which were completely unrehearsed jam sessions, others which contained more conventional rock songs.

Formation
Members of The Source Family, (who lived in the former Harry Chandler mansion in Los Feliz in the Hollywood Hills in the early 1970s, decided to fuse their musical talents and spirituality by forming an improvisational, psychedelic music group. They began to press LPs in 1973, most of which were recorded after hours of meditation at 3:00-6:00 a.m. in a soundproofed garage that served as the musicians’ studio at the family's communal residence. All of the records with Father Yod's participation were completely improvised, with no rehearsals or overdubs. Most of the albums were pressed in small runs of only 500 to 1000 copies on the Higher Key label. They were sold to the general public in Father Yod's popular vegetarian Source Restaurant for $10 each. Though only nine LPs were produced and released, it is rumored that more than 65 albums were recorded by the group but were lost over the years. Isis Aquarian, who was the family historian, archivist and one of Father's wives, recently found a lot of these unreleased music tapes in her archives and they are now being remastered and released through Drag City Records of Chicago and their site www.Yahowha.org

The band changed members occasionally, morphing into various incarnations, from Father Yod and the Spirit of ’76 to Ya Ho Wha 13 to The Savage Sons of Ya Ho Wha, Yodship, and Fire Water Air; but the key players were always the same: (Djin Aquarian on guitar, Octavius Aquarian on drums, and Sunflower Aquarian on bass) along with other family musicians Lovely Aquarian, Zoroaster Aquarian, Hom Aquarian, Rhythm Aquarian, Pythias Aquarian, Aquariana Aquarian, Ahom Aquarian, Electron Aquarian. Father Yod does not appear on all their album releases, but for those on which he participates, he handles lead vocals and percussion, via a kettle drum. Yahowha 13 was Father Yod's signature band. He said that its music would continue his teaching (by the words he used) long after he was gone. Sky Saxon of The Seeds had joined the Source Family in 1973 and occasionally appeared on the band's recordings.

Discography

Father Yod and the Spirit of ‘76
 Kohoutek  (1973)
 Contraction (1974)
 Expansion (1974)
 All or Nothing at All (1974)

Father Yod does not participate on All or Nothing at All, unlike the previous three albums released under this incarnation, in which his chanting and singing vocals are prominent.

Ya Ho Wa 13
 Ya Ho Wa 13 (1974), recorded at the Father House garage.
 Savage Sons of Ya Ho Wa (1974), recorded at the Father House garage.
 Penetration: An Aquarian Symphony (1974), recorded at the Father House garage, is the band's most popular recording and has been reissued several times.
 I'm Gonna Take You Home (1974), also called The Lovers, was recorded at the Father House garage.
 To the Principles, For the Children (1974), recorded at the Father House garage.
 The Operetta (1975), not released until the 2000s.
By the end of 1974, the Source Family had tried to move to Hawaii but were met with hostility, which forced them to temporarily relocate to Northern California before eventually returning. This album was recorded during that time and the tension is apparent. It has been described as “a more personalized, painfully vulnerable” collection of songs. This long-lost final opus of Ya Ho Wha with Father's participation was recently released by Swordfish Records. It was recorded in the spring of 1975, just after Ya Ho Wha's spontaneous visit to the India, which culminated in his initiation in the Great Pyramid of Giza on Easter Sunday. He was en route to the US via France when the plane was re-routed due to a storm and forced to land in Cairo Egypt. Upon arrival the group (there were four traveling) hailed a taxi, and the taxi driver suggested they stay at his brothers house and the next morning at 4am they proceeded to the Great Pyramids. Upon arrival they were greeted by a mysterious man who escorted them through the Great Pyramid. This LP represents the first recording Ya Ho Wha made after his “resurrection” in the Great Pyramid, and is also his last full collaboration with the band.

 Sonic Portation, the first record release of the remaining members of YaHoWha13 in over 33 years through ProphaseMusic. The band released two more albums called 2013.

Music after Father's death
After Father Yod / Ya Ho Wha's hang-gliding accident and death in Hawaii 1975, the original Yahowa 13 band dissolved, though many of the members continue to make music.

 Golden Sunrise (Fire Water Air, 1977), the first recording after Father Yod's death and the first featured appearance of Sky Saxon of The Seeds.
 Yodship Suite (1977) was a private pressing and, except for Sky Saxon, the specific family members involved are unknown. The sound takes on a softer, less acid rock tone with flutes and acoustic guitars, and most of the songs are laments about Father's death.
 Yodship Suite, Part 3, the last Ya Ho Wha-related album to be released. This poorly documented album features recordings from 1973 featuring the Spirit of '76 band, but with Sky Saxon on vocals instead of Father Yod. It's a one-sided LP with about 15 minutes of music, containing two different tracks spliced together. The music is considerably more aggressive than the preceding Yod Ship Suite. Only 2–3 copies of this album are known to exist.

Ya Ho Wha 13's Music Today

The original LP pressings of all incarnations of Ya Ho Wha 13 are now very rare and valued highly by music collectors; the albums Contraction and Expansion are especially sought-after. All or Nothing at All and Yodship are possibly the rarest, though considered somewhat less musically accessible.

Sky Saxon, singer of the seminal garage band The Seeds collaborated with Japanese label Captain Trip Records in 1998 to produce a deluxe 13-CD box set entitled God and Hair, including CD reissues of the original Source Family records and some unreleased material.
In 2002, The Source Foundation Corp LLC/Source.Org was created, and is currently not affiliated with the remaining members of YaHoWha13, nor involved with present musical endeavors.

Swordfish Records in the UK, in collaboration with The Source Foundation Corp LLC remastered and released some of the Higher Key Record Catalog as both limited pressing LPs and CDs. This includes, Penetration, I'm Going to Take You Home (Lovers/Chariot), and To the Principles for the Children. In the summer of 2009, Drag City Records released Magnificence in the Memory, rare cuts of YaHoWha13 from the archives of the Source Foundation.

In 2007, the three surviving members of YaHoWha13 (Sunflower, Octavius and Djin) were invited by Isis Aquarian and Jodi Wille of Process to play in Los Angeles for their Source Book coming out event the untold story of "Father Yod, Yahowha13 and the Source Family". This was the first time they had played together in 33 years. This led to their first recording of Sonic Portation (Prophase Music). YaHoWha13 made several appearances in Los Angeles and San Francisco.

In 2009, YaHoWha13 played to packed houses with much enthusiasm on the East Coast, and in Canada. They are currently working on their new live/studio album, and appeared at The South by SouthWest Music Festival in Austin, Texas, in Spring of 2010 - playing with experimental psychedelic bands The Acid Mothers Temple and Plastic Crimewave Sound.

See also
Father Yod
Tom Stone

References

Further reading

External links
 Ya Ho Wha 13.com (band web site)
 Ya Ho Wha.org  (web site for The Source Foundation)
 "The Ya Ho Wa 13 Interview" (June, 2002) by Gary Bearman at Perfect Sound Forever
 "A Home Unlike All Others" (8/19/07) Los Angeles Times article about The Source Family
 "Father Yod Knew Best" Doug Harvey's LA Weekly cover story on the Source Family (August 30, 2007)

Musical collectives
Psychedelic rock music groups from California